The rusty-crowned tit-spinetail (Leptasthenura pileata) is a species of bird in the family Furnariidae. It is endemic to Peru. Its natural habitats are subtropical or tropical moist montane forest and subtropical or tropical high-altitude shrubland.

References

rusty-crowned tit-spinetail
Birds of the Peruvian Andes
Endemic birds of Peru
rusty-crowned tit-spinetail
rusty-crowned tit-spinetail
Taxonomy articles created by Polbot